The Northern Lights Cathedral - Alta Church is a parish church of the Church of Norway in Alta Municipality in Troms og Finnmark county. It is located in the central part of the town of Alta. It is the main church for the Alta parish as well as the seat of the Alta prosti (deanery) in the Diocese of Nord-Hålogaland. The modern church was built in a circular style in 2013 using plans drawn up by the architectural firm , in collaboration with Schmidt Hammer Lassen Architects. The church seats about 350 people. Prior to the opening of this church, the main church for the parish was the historic Alta Church.

Design
The church construction period was 2009–2013. The building was constructed of concrete and wood with external cladding of titanium sheets. The central feature is its large spiral with belfry. The interior contains artwork by the artist Peter Brandes.

The cathedral is the result of an architectural competition launched in 2001 and was designed by Schmidt Hammer Lassen Architects in collaboration with architect Kolbjørn Jenssen of Link Arkitektur. It was consecrated on 10 February 2013 by the Bishop Per Oskar Kjølaas, with the Crown Princess Mette Marit in attendance. The church was built to replace the old Alta Church as the main church for the parish and deanery.

Name
The "Northern Lights" are the Aurora Borealis associated with the Arctic night sky. At the opening service, bishop Per Oskar Kjølaas admitted that the word  was contentious since it technically meant not a parish church but a cathedral (for which the more common Norwegian word is ).

Media gallery

See also
List of churches in Nord-Hålogaland

References

External links
Nordlyskatedralen website

Alta, Norway
Churches in Finnmark
21st-century Church of Norway church buildings
Churches completed in 2013
2013 establishments in Norway
Fan-shaped churches in Norway
Concrete churches in Norway